Mikhail Elgin and Andrei Vasilevski were the defending champions but chose not to defend their title.

Kevin Krawietz and Andreas Mies won the title after defeating Dustin Brown and Antonio Šančić 6–1, 7–6(7–5) in the final.

Seeds

Draw

References
 Main Draw

Bucher Reisen Tennis Grand Prix - Doubles
2017 Doubles